Gümüşakar is a village in the Refahiye District of Erzincan Province in Turkey. According to the 2012 census, it has a population of 98.

References

Villages in Refahiye District